Batalage is a village in Serbia. It is situated in the Koceljeva municipality, in the Mačva District of Central Serbia. The village had a Serb ethnic majority and a population of 501 in 2002.

Historical population

1948: 999
1953: 999
1961: 941
1971: 877
1981: 759
1991: 619
2002: 501

References

See also
List of places in Serbia

Populated places in Mačva District